Argyrogramma subaurea is a moth of the family Noctuidae. It is found in Africa, including (and possibly restricted to) Ivory Coast.

Plusiinae
Moths of Africa
Moths described in 1972